Matías Damián Vila (born 7 July 1979 in Buenos Aires) is a field hockey midfielder from Argentina, who made his debut for the national squad in 1997, and competed for his native country in the 2000 Summer Olympics, 2004 Summer Olympics and 2012 Summer Olympics.

Vila started to play hockey aged seven. After the Athens Games he moved from Banco Provincia to a Dutch club Tilburg, which had just been promoted to the top league in the Netherlands, together with fellow-international Tomás MacCormik. His younger brothers Rodrigo and Lucas are also field hockey internationals for Argentina. With the national squad, Matías has won the bronze medal at the 2008 Men's Hockey Champions Trophy and four medals at the Pan American Games.

References

External links

 "Pakistan, Argentina keep hopes alive", 3 March 2002.  The Tribune, Chandigarh, India.

1979 births
Living people
Argentine male field hockey players
Male field hockey midfielders
Olympic field hockey players of Argentina
Argentine field hockey coaches
Field hockey players from Buenos Aires
Field hockey players at the 2000 Summer Olympics
2002 Men's Hockey World Cup players
Field hockey players at the 2004 Summer Olympics
2006 Men's Hockey World Cup players
2010 Men's Hockey World Cup players
Field hockey players at the 2011 Pan American Games
Field hockey players at the 2012 Summer Olympics
World Series Hockey players
Pan American Games gold medalists for Argentina
Pan American Games silver medalists for Argentina
Pan American Games medalists in field hockey
Medalists at the 1999 Pan American Games
Medalists at the 2003 Pan American Games
Medalists at the 2007 Pan American Games
Medalists at the 2011 Pan American Games
21st-century Argentine people